Likferd is the fourth and final full-length studio album by Norwegian black metal band Windir, which was released in 2003. It was the last official album released by Windir before the death of vocalist Valfar.

Track listing
All songs written by Valfar & Hvàll.

Personnel
 Valfar – vocals and additional instruments
 Hvàll – bass
 Steingrim – drums
 Sture – rhythm guitar
 Strom – lead guitar
 Righ – synth

Additional personnel
 Cosmocrator – clean vocals
 Tom Kvalsvoll - mastering
 Thorbjørn Akkerhaugen - mixing, co-producer
 Stig Ese - producer, mixing

References

Windir albums
2003 albums